Kemess Creek Airport  is located near Kemess Mine, British Columbia, Canada.

References

External links

Registered aerodromes in British Columbia
Peace River Regional District